Juliette Atkinson won the singles tennis title of the 1898 U.S. Women's National Singles Championship by defeating challenger Marion Jones 6–3, 5–7, 6–4, 2–6, 7–5 in the Challenge Round, surviving five matchpoints in the final set. It was Atkinon's third singles title, after 1895 and 1897,  which gave her permanent ownership of the Wissahickon Inn Challenge Cup. Jones had won the right to challenge Atkinson by defeating Helen Crump 6–4, 7–5, 6–4 in the final of the All Comers' competition. The event was played on outdoor grass courts and held at the Philadelphia Cricket Club in Wissahickon Heights, Chestnut Hill, Philadelphia from June 14 through June 18, 1898.

Draw

Challenge round

All Comers' finals

References

1898
1898 in American women's sports
June 1898 sports events
Women's Singles
1898 in women's tennis
Women's sports in Pennsylvania
Chestnut Hill, Philadelphia
1898 in sports in Pennsylvania